The 1978 Kangaroo tour of Great Britain and France comprised the Australia national rugby league team's fourteenth tour of Great Britain and ninth tour of France, and took place from September to December 1978. Coached by Frank Stanton and captained by Bob Fulton, the Australian team, also known as the Kangaroos, played a match against Wales before contesting the Ashes series against Great Britain, winning the third and deciding Test match. The tourists then moved on to France where they were narrowly beaten in both Tests, the last series the Kangaroos would lose until 2005. In addition to these six internationals, the Australians played sixteen other matches against local club and representative sides in both countries. The 1978 Kangaroo tour followed the tour of 1973 while the next tour would be staged in 1982.

Background 
The 1978 Kangaroo tour was the first since 1973 and took place in the wake of Australia's rugby league season. Sydney's 1978 NSWRFL season, which contributed the vast majority of the tourists, ended later in the year than usual as it involved a grand final replay. For the English the tour was conducted during the first half of the 1978–79 Northern Rugby Football League season.

Touring squad 
The Australian team's coach was Frank Stanton, who had already taken the City, New South Wales and the Manly-Warringah teams to victory in all of their respective competitions that year. Eastern Suburbs's captain (and former Manly premiership captain under Stanton in 1976), Bob Fulton, was selected to be the touring Australian side's skipper while Cronulla back rower Greg Pierce was named as vice-captain. Manly-Warringah Grand Final winner John Harvey created some controversy when he declined selection for the tour due to personal reasons. As a result, his Manly-Warringah teammate Bruce Walker was called in as a replacement. Another Manly premiership winner Terry Randall also declined to tour citing exhaustion after Manly's arduous finals campaign in 1978 where the Sea Eagles played 6 matched in 24 days, including the drawn Grand Final against Cronulla-Sutherland and the replay played just three days later. He later admitted regret in not touring. One shock omission was Manly centre Russel Gartner who had played two games for Australia in the 1977 World Cup including the Final in which he scored a spectacular 65 metre solo try. Gartner, a speedy outside back who could play either centre or wing, had scored two tries in the Grand Final replay, one a 70-metre effort where he easily outpaced the Cronulla defence despite having torn his hamstring a week earlier, was considered unlucky not to tour.

Of the 28 man squad, only three Queensland based players were chosen - Souths Innisfail winger Kerry Boustead, Brisbane Easts prop forward Rod Morris and Redcliffe halfback Greg Oliphant. The only other Queenslanders in the squad were St George back rower Rod Reddy and Manly forward Bruce Walker.

The tour manager was Canterbury-Bankstown Chief Executive Peter "Bullfrog" Moore, with Jim Caldwell as the co-manager.

Craig Young was named 'player of the tour'. Bob Fulton was the tourists' top try scorer with 9. Michael Cronin was the tourists' top point scorer with 142.

|- style="background:#ccf;"
| Player
| Club
| Position(s)
| Tests
| Matches
| Tries
| Goals
| F/Goals
| Points
|- style="background:#fff;"
|  Chris Anderson
|  Canterbury-Bankstown Bulldogs
| 
| 5
|
|
|
|
|
|- style="background:#fff;"
|  Kerry Boustead
|  Innisfail Souths (Qld)
| 
| 5
|
|
|
|
|
|- style="background:#fff;"
|  Les Boyd
|  Western Suburbs Magpies
| 
| 3
|
|
|
|
|
|- style="background:#fff;"
|  Larry Corowa
|  Balmain Tigers
| 
| 0
|
|
|
|
|
|- style="background:#fff;"
|  Michael Cronin
|  Parramatta Eels
| 
| 5
|
|
|
|
| 142
|- style="background:#fff;"
|  Graham Eadie
|  Manly-Warringah Sea Eagles
| 
| 5
|
|
|
|
|
|- style="background:#fff;"
|  Bob Fulton (c)
|  Eastern Suburbs Roosters
| 
| 5
|
| 9
|
|
|
|- style="background:#fff;"
|  Geoff Gerard
|  Parramatta Eels
| 
| 5
|
|
|
|
|
|- style="background:#fff;"
|  Johnny Gibbs
|  Manly-Warringah Sea Eagles
| 
| 0
|
|
|
|
|
|- style="background:#fff;"
|  Ron Hilditch
|  Parramatta Eels
| 
| 1
|
|
|
|
|
|- style="background:#fff;"
|  Steve Kneen
|  Cronulla-Sutherland Sharks
| 
| 0
|
|
|
|
|
|- style="background:#fff;"
|  Max Krilich
|  Manly-Warringah Sea Eagles
| 
| 2
|
|
|
|
|
|- style="background:#fff;"
|  Steve Martin
|  Manly-Warringah Sea Eagles
| 
| 1
|
|
|
|
|
|- style="background:#fff;"
|  Allan McMahon
|  Balmain Tigers
| 
| 0
|
|
|
|
|
|- style="background:#fff;"
|  Rod Morris
|  Eastern Suburbs Tigers (Qld)
| 
| 2
|
|
|
|
|
|- style="background:#fff;"
|  Greg Oliphant
|  Redcliffe Dolphins (Qld)
| 
| 0
|
|
|
|
|
|- style="background:#fff;"
|  Graham Olling
|  Parramatta Eels
| 
| 3
|
|
|
|
|
|- style="background:#fff;"
|  George Peponis
|  Canterbury-Bankstown Bulldogs
| 
| 2
|
|
|
|
|
|- style="background:#fff;"
|  Greg Pierce (vc)
|  Cronulla-Sutherland Sharks
| 
| 0
|
|
|
|
|
|- style="background:#fff;"
|  Ray Price
|  Parramatta Eels
| 
| 5
|
|
|
|
|
|- style="background:#fff;"
|  Tommy Raudonikis
|  Western Suburbs Magpies
| 
| 5
|
|
|
|
|
|- style="background:#fff;"
|  Rod Reddy
|  St George Dragons
| 
| 3
|
|
|
|
|
|- style="background:#fff;"
|  Steve Rogers
|  Cronulla-Sutherland Sharks
| 
| 4
|
|
|
|
|
|- style="background:#fff;"
|  Ian Schubert
|  Eastern Suburbs Roosters
| 
| 0
|
|
|
|
|
|- style="background:#fff;"
|  Alan Thompson
|  Manly-Warringah Sea Eagles
| 
| 3
|
|
|
|
|
|- style="background:#fff;"
|  Ian Thomson
|  Manly-Warringah Sea Eagles
| 
| 2
|
|
|
|
|
|- style="background:#fff;"
|  Bruce Walker
|  Manly-Warringah Sea Eagles
| 
| 0
|
|
|
|
|
|- style="background:#fff;"
|  Craig Young
|  St George Dragons
| 
| 5
|
|
|
|
|
|-

Great Britain leg

Test Venues 
The three Ashes series tests took place at the following venues.

A controversial late Alan Gwilliam try gave Warrington a 15–12 win over Australia, with Steve Hesford kicking six goals. In the tourists' first lost match of the tour Warrington's packmen Tommy Martyn, Mike Nicholas, Tommy Cunningham and Roy Lester were in superb form, ably supported by replacement half backs Gwilliam and Clark. This was Warrington's eighth win over Australia since .

Wales 
The Kangaroos played a non-test international against Wales at the St. Helen's Ground. As of 2017 this was the 13th and final rugby league international played at the ground.

Kangaroos' vice captain Greg Pierce injured his knee in this match and made no more appearances on the tour.

1st Ashes Test 
This year Great Britain had the opportunity to re-gain the Ashes title on home soil. The Ashes series was styled the "Forward Chemicals Test series" due to sponsorship reasons.

Great Britain were trailing 6-7 with fifteen minutes remaining when an Australian pass went to ground and Welsh winger John Bevan kicked the ball ahead. It was then a foot race between him and Australian fullback Graham Eadie to reach the ball which was slowing within Australia's in-goal area. Both players stumbled and dived, with Bevan getting a hand on the ball and claiming the try which was awarded, giving the home side a 9-7 lead. The Kangaroos then worked their way up to the other end of the field and moved the ball through the hands out to the right wing where Kerry Boustead crossed for a try, regaining his side the lead 9-10. In the final minutes Australian captain Bob Fulton forced his way over for a try which was also converted, so the match ended with the scoreline at 9-15.

Widnes: David Eckersley, Stuart Wright, Malcolm Aspey, Mick George, Mick Burke, Eric Hughes, Reg Bowden, Brian Hogan, Keith Elwell, Jim Mills, Mick Adams, David Hull, Doug Laughton (c). Coach - Doug Laughton

Australia: Allan McMahon, Ian Schubert, Michael Cronin (c), Alan Thompson, Chris Anderson, Steve Martin, Greg Oliphant, Rod Morris, Ron Hilditch, Ian Thomson, Geoff Gerard, Steve Kneen, Ray Price. Res - Bob Fulton, Bruce Walker

Widnes, the reigning British champions, were leading 7–2 half time. Up to and including the last Kangaroo tour in which Australia played English club teams as part of their schedule in 1994, this was the last game the Kangaroos lost to an English club side. This was also the only time in what would be 15 tour games between 1909–1990 that Widnes would defeat The Kangaroos. Their previous best result was a 13–all draw on 21 October 1937 during the 1937–38 tour.

2nd Ashes Test 
Several changes were made to the Great Britain team, including a completely new front row. This match was broadcast live.

In the final minutes of the first half the British had just made their way into Australia's half of the field when they made a break up the middle through Roger Millward. He then kicked the ball ahead as he was being tackled and his winger Stuart Wright was chasing through to get a hand on it and score. The try was converted so the home side led at the break 11 – 4.

In the second half Britain's right centre John Joyner made a break and popped a pass over to his winger Stuart Wright to cross once again. They won the match 18–14 to bring the series to 1-all.

This would be the last time Great Britain beat Australia in a Test match for another ten years.

Wigan: George Fairbairn, Dennis Ramsdale, David Willicombe, Alan Greenall, Jimmy Hornby, Keiron O'Loughlin, Bernard Coyle, John Wood, Tony Karalius, Steve O'Neill, John Foran, Bill Melling, Dennis Boyd. Res - Malcolm Swann, David Regan. Coach - Vince Karalius

Australia: Allan McMahon, Larry Corowa, Steve Rogers, Michael Cronin, Ian Schubert, Alan Thompson, Steve Martin, Ian Thomson, Ron Hilditch, Rod Morris, Geoff Gerard, Les Boyd, Bruce Walker

At half time Wigan trailed Australia 2 – 5.

In a Leeds bar, a member of Surrey rock band The Jam, Paul Weller, glassed the face of Jim Caldwell, the team manager from Queensland. Australian player Larry Corowa ran to defend the bloodied Caldwell, was punched from behind himself and raced into a nearby bar to get teammates to provide reinforcements for the brawl that ensued. One member of The Jam landed in hospital with broken ribs and another was reported at the time to have been charged with assault. The official police statement cleared the Australians of any wrongdoing.

The game against St Helens saw the largest non-test attendance of the tour of 16,532.

3rd Ashes Test 
Warrington's John Bevan came into the centres for Leeds star Les Dyl, while Hull F.C. prop Vince Farrar made his Great Britain debut in place of second test Man of the Match, Hull Kingston Rovers' forward Brian Lockwood who was unavailable due to injury.
The Kangaroos maintained the same backline from the 2nd Test, but brought George Peponis, Rod Morris and Les Boyd into their forward pack.

The deciding test attracted the largest attendance of any match on the tour. After two penalty goals by Mick Cronin Australia led by 4 points to nil. The Kangaroos then got the first try of the match with a close-range dive from George Peponis at dummy-half. The conversion by Cronin was successful so Australia led 9 – 0. The visitors scored another try when the ball was passed from dummy-half to a steamrolling Les Boyd who raced through to score under the goal posts, bringing the lead to 12 – 0. Later, after making a break and crossing the half-way line Raudonikis passed to Geoff Gerard who ran the remaining metres to score untouched, making the score 17 – 0.

Australian fullback Graham Eadie crossed early in the second half but the try was controversially disallowed for a forward pass. Bob Fulton took the Australians' lead out to 20–0 with a drop-goal early in the second half. Great Britain scored the first try of the second half when 31-year-old Roger Millward, captaining Great Britain for the last time, reached out of a tackle and bounced the ball off the turf of the Australian in-goal area. The home side scored again when they moved the ball through the hands out to the left wing where Bevan dived over in the corner. The Kangaroos scored next when Raudonikis, directly from a scrum win, ran through and put the ball down.

Australia therefore retained the Ashes with the first of a fourteen-year winning streak between these two sides that would last until 1988.

France leg

1st Test 
Steve Martin was selected to make his Test debut.

France won the first Test 13–10 at Stade Albert Domec in Carcassonne.

2nd Test 

The referee was Mr Laverny from Bordeaux. France were coached by Roger Garrigue.
Their line-up included world class players, lock, Joël Roosebrouck and prop, Didier Hermet from Villeneuve-Sur-Lot, and Jean-Marc Bourret in the centres. Ron Hilditch played at hooker in place of Max Krilich who was injured.
France claimed a 2–0 series win over the touring Kangaroos with an 11–10 result at the Stade Municipal, Toulouse in front of 6,500 spectators.

France thus became the last team to record successive victories against Australia in a single series. This would be the last time the Kangaroos failed to win a series or tournament until the 2005 Tri-Nations.

Statistics 
Leading Try Scorer
 9 by Bob Fulton

Leading Point Scorer
 142 by Michael Cronin

Largest Attendance
 30,604 - Third test vs Great Britain at Headingley Stadium

Largest Club Game Attendance
 16,352 - St. Helens vs Australia at Knowsley Road

References 

Australia national rugby league team tours
Kangaroo tour
Kangaroo tour
Kangaroo tour
Kangaroo tour